Wheatgrass is the freshly sprouted first leaves of the common wheat plant (Triticum aestivum), used as a food, drink, or dietary supplement. Wheatgrass is served freeze dried or fresh, and so it differs from wheat malt, which is convectively dried. Wheatgrass is allowed to grow longer and taller than wheat malt.

Like most plants, wheatgrass contains chlorophyll, amino acids, minerals, vitamins and enzymes. Claims about the health benefits of wheatgrass range from providing supplemental nutrition to having unique curative properties, but these claims have not been scientifically proven.

Wheatgrass juice is often available at juice bars, and some people grow and juice their own in their homes. It is available fresh as produce, in tablets, frozen juice, and powder. Wheatgrass is also sold commercially as a spray, cream, gel, massage lotion, and liquid herbal supplement. Because it is extracted from wheatgrass sprouts (that is, before the wheat seed or "berry" begins to form), wheatgrass juice is gluten free, but some dietitians recommend that those with celiac disease avoid it due to the risk of cross-contamination.

History
Wheatgrass is traditionally used in both Persian and Indian festivals and rituals. Hindu sow wheat or barley seeds on the first day of Navaratri pooja and offer the saplings to the mother goddess on the last day as part of the rituals. However, the consumption of wheatgrass in the Western world began in the 1930s as a result of experiments conducted by Charles Schnabel in his attempts to popularize the plant. By 1940, cans of Schnabel's powdered grass were on sale in major drug stores throughout the United States and Canada.

Ann Wigmore was also a strong advocate for the consumption of wheatgrass as a part of a raw food diet. Wigmore, founder of the Hippocrates Health Institute, believed that wheatgrass, as a part of a raw food diet, would cleanse the body of toxins while providing a proper balance of nutrients as a whole food. She also taught that wheatgrass could be used to treat those with serious disease. Both of these claims are believed by many reputable health institutes to be entirely unfounded by facts, and possibly dangerous.

Cultivation 

Wheatgrass can be grown indoors or outdoors. A common method for sprout production indoors is often on trays in a growth medium such as a potting mix. Leaves are harvested when they develop a "split" as another leaf emerges. These can then be cut off with scissors and allow a second crop of shoots to form. Sometimes a third cutting is possible, but may be tougher and have fewer sugars than the first.

Schnabel's research was conducted with wheatgrass grown outdoors in Kansas. His wheatgrass required 200 days of slow growth through the winter and early spring, when it was harvested at the jointing stage. He claimed that at this stage the plant reached its peak nutritional value; after jointing, concentrations of chlorophyll, protein, and vitamins decline sharply. Wheatgrass is harvested, freeze-dried, then sold in tablet and powdered concentrates for human and animal consumption. Indoor-grown wheatgrass is used to make wheatgrass juice powder.

Nutrition and health claims 

Proponents of wheatgrass make many claims for its health properties, ranging from promotion of general well-being to cancer prevention. However, according to the American Cancer Society, "available scientific evidence does not support the idea that wheatgrass or the wheatgrass diet can cure or prevent disease".

Nutritional content
Wheatgrass is a source of potassium, dietary fiber, vitamin A, vitamin C, vitamin E (alpha tocopherol), vitamin K, thiamin, riboflavin, niacin, vitamin B6, pantothenic acid, iron, zinc, copper, manganese, and selenium. It is also a good source of protein, with up to 8 grams per ounce if consumed in powder form or around 1 g in a "shot" of juice. This protein content consists of at least 17 forms of amino acids, including eight out of nine essential amino acids.

The nutrient content of wheatgrass juice is roughly equivalent to that of dark leafy vegetables.

Vitamin B12 is not contained within wheatgrass or any vegetable, as vitamin B12 is not made by plants; rather it is a byproduct of the microorganisms living on plants or in the surrounding soil. There are some claims that analysis of wheatgrass have found B12 in negligible amounts; however, there are no reliable sources cited to back up the claim. It is also worth noting that an analysis of wheat grass by the USDA National Nutrient Database reports that wheatgrass contains no vitamin B12.

See also
 Wheat sprout
 List of juices

References

External links 

 
  Alt URL
 

Dietary supplements
Grasses
Symbols of South Dakota
Grass